William Jennings "Duke" Kenworthy (July 4, 1886 – September 21, 1950) was a Major League Baseball second baseman. He played all or part of four seasons in the majors, two of which— and —were spent as the starting second baseman for the Kansas City Packers of the short-lived Federal League.

Kenworthy was born to Ohio farmers and attended Muskingum College, where he received a teaching degree. He played minor league baseball as a pitcher and utility infielder from 1907 to 1911. After a short stint with the Washington Senators in the 1912 season, Kenworthy spent the 1913 season in the Pacific Coast League. In January 1914, Kenworthy signed a three-year contract with the Federal League's Kansas City Packers, which saw become the team's starting second baseman and the leading hitter. His 15 home runs in 1914 finished second in the league.

In 285 games over four seasons, Kenworthy posted a .304 batting average (301-for-989) with 159 runs, 71 doubles, 21 triples, 18 home runs, 146 RBI, 61 stolen bases, 67 bases on balls, .360 on-base percentage and .473 slugging percentage. He finished his career with a .946 fielding percentage playing primarily at second base and several games at left and right field.

In 1917, he gained a World War I draft exemption for a growth over one of his eyes; he aided the war effort by working at a shipyard in Oakland, California. He continued playing and managing in the minor leagues until 1924.

Kenworthy drowned while fishing off the California coast on September 21, 1950.

References

Sources

Major League Baseball second basemen
Washington Senators (1901–1960) players
Kansas City Packers players
St. Louis Browns players
Zanesville Infants players
Denver Grizzlies (baseball) players
Sacramento Sacts players
Oakland Oaks (baseball) players
Los Angeles Angels (minor league) players
Seattle Rainiers players
Portland Beavers players
Columbus Senators players
Baseball players from Ohio
People from Cambridge, Ohio
Portland Beavers managers
Accidental deaths in California
Deaths by drowning in California
1886 births
1950 deaths
Zanesville Potters players